Sunset Bain is a supervillain appearing in American comic books published by Marvel Comics. She is a shady businesswoman who occasionally masquerades as Madame Menace. Although very technologically adept, she personally does not have any super-powers. Publicly she is the CEO of Baintronics. Privately she maintains her wealth through black market weaponry deals and other shady practices. She primarily is an adversary of Machine Man and Iron Man.

Sunset Bain is an underworld armorer who supplies sophisticated weaponry to an elite clientele of master criminals, terrorists, and revolutionaries.

Publication history
Sunset Bain first appeared in Machine Man #17-18 (Oct.–Dec. 1980), and was created by Tom DeFalco (writer), and Steve Ditko (artist).

The character subsequently appears in Ghost Rider #63 (Dec. 1981); Solo Avengers #17 (April 1989); Iron Man Annual #11 (1990); Spider-Man #26 (Sept. 1992); Web of Spider-Man #99-100 (April–May 1993); Iron Man vol. 3 #1 (Feb. 1998), #4 (May 1998), #11-12 (Nov.–Dec. 1998), and #18-20 (July–Sept. 1999); Taskmaster #1-4 (April–July 2002); Punisher War Journal vol. 2 #17 (May 2008); and Marvel Comics Presents #10-12 (Aug.–Oct. 2008).

Sunset Bain received an entry in the All-New Official Handbook of the Marvel Universe A-Z #1 (2006).

Fictional character biography
Sunset Bain got her start by seducing fellow MIT undergraduate Tony Stark into revealing the security codes for Stark Industries. Shortly thereafter, a force of masked men invaded and stole several prototypes. Within a year, Baintronics was founded and Sunset broke it off with Stark. While Baintronic maintained a spotless reputation, Sunset assumed the Madame Menace persona and sold high-tech weaponry to criminals via "a tremendously profitable underground seasonal "Sharper Villain" catalog of armaments."

When Machine Man lost an arm while fighting Baron Brimstone and the Satan Squad, Madame Menace bought it, obtaining a low price by threatening the seller "with one of her flesh-eating roaches." Her plans for reverse engineering the limb were interrupted when Machine Man came to claim it. Despite her electromagnets and sonic disrupter cannon, Machine Man prevailed, and Sunset had to blow up her yacht to escape. An accidental run-in with Alpha Flight members Aurora, Northstar and Sasquatch eventually persuaded her to set aside her Machine Man machinations for a while. Madame Menace then made a few minor appearances supplying weapons to Ghost Rider villain Orb, and then Doctor Octopus.

Sunset next showed up in a meeting with Tony Stark which was interrupted when a damaged Machine Man showed up with the head of Jocasta, having lost a battle to Terminus. Stark changed into Iron Man and brought the damaged androids to Baintronics, where under the guise of assistance, Sunset created knockoff duplicates of the robots. When the repaired Machine Man left, Sunset managed to give him the fake Jocasta. The real Jocasta and false Machine Man left with Baintronics laid in-continuity foundations for the Machine Man 2020 miniseries.

After this, Sunset as Madame Menace teamed with the New Enforcers in their plot to take over the fallen Kingpin's crime cartel  Ostensibly, Bain did this in order to study the New Enforcers technology, including Dragon Man, Dreadnought and the Super-Adaptoid.

Having failed to decode the intricacies of Jocasta's A.I., Sunset decided to hire Tony Stark to investigate. As Stark was already employed otherwise, Sunset hired the new War Machine to destroy his current employers. After Iron Man defeated Fin Fang Foom, Baintronics took the contract for transporting the beast's massive bulk. Using this as an in, Sunset asked Tony to work for her again. Growing suspicious, Stark accepted in order to learn more. Stark then freed Jocasta and persuaded the new War Machine to stop working for Sunset Bain.

Later, Sunset hired Taskmaster to sabotage a Stark Enterprises operation. In lieu of paying him, she betrayed him to the police. In retaliation, the Taskmaster instigated a war between the Triads and Baintronics. He even managed to shoot Sunset in the shoulder. As of the end of the mini-series, the hostilities between the two were unresolved, but aside from their enmity, the status quo was mostly restored.

She was shot several times by the Punisher, but has since resurfaced as an opponent of Machine Man again.

During the "Opening Salvo" part of the "Secret Empire" storyline, Sunset Bain in her Madame Menace attire was recruited by Baron Helmut Zemo to join the Army of Evil.

As he went on a globetrotting journey, Arno Stark met Sunset Bain. He joined up with Sunset Bain's company Baintronics in a plot to steal data from Stark Unlimited.

During the "Iron Man 2020" arc, Sunset Bain calls up Arno Stark about the robots acting up. At Bain Tower, Sunset is approached by Dr. Bhang and his cat Dr. Shapiro on wanting to see Jocasta where they are denied. She takes the translation collar that is the actual Dr. Shapiro claiming that the A.I. Army would take control of it. Machinesmith shows Machine Man and Quasimodo the news that Arno Stark and Sunset Bain are using Baintronics to acquire a robotics factory and destroy it to avoid the A.I. Army from acquiring new members much to the dismay of Machine Man. In Sunset Bain's helicopter, Dr. Andrew Bhang informs Sunset Bain that the robots like animatronic mascots and room-bots are protesting on the streets. While stating that they are heading to Baintronics to tear it down, Sunset Bain figures out that Dr. Bhang is the A.I. Army's mole where he has been feeding information to Bethany Cabe who has been feeding it to Mark One. Dr. Bhang admits to Sunset Bain that he is just helping the A.I. Army because of the robot slavery. She has Dr. Bhang deposited on the roof where his stuff is while fire him as she vows that he will not work in this sector again. During Machine Man's confrontation with X-52 and Jocasta, it was mentioned by X-52 that Sunset Bain is no longer operating as Madame Menace. At Bain Tower, Sunset Bain meets with defense leaders of different countries where she states to them that the A.I. Army has scattered as well as the development of the Iron Legion. Sunset Bain later goes to Arno Stark's work station where he is working on reviving his parents by recreating the Arsenal and Motherboard bodies from the eScape as well as a new way to regain control of the rebellious robots since the obedience code can either be blocked or corrupted. Arno reveals to Sunset that she is an A.I. when he had to fix the tiny scar on her face as it shows her and some other people in stasis pods. Her body is disintegrated by her A.I. counterpart who dislikes competition.

Powers and abilities
Sunset is a genius-level inventor; she controls the resources of Baintronics and other smaller companies, as well as a small army of uniformed criminal hirelings. She rarely uses her inventions herself, preferring to sell them.

Sunset Bain A.I.
During the Christos Gage and Dan Slott "Iron Man 2020" arc, Arno Stark created an A.I. version of Sunset Bain when he had to fix a tiny scar on her face as she is shown the real Sunset Bain's body in one of the stasis pods. The Sunset Bain A.I. states to Dr. Shapiro that her real counterpart became rich operating as Madame Menace as she disintegrates the real Sunset Bain stating how she dislikes competition. When she suspects that she frightened Dr. Shapiro, the Sunset Bain A.I. finds that Dr. Shapiro is the real mole and not as dumb as she thought as an Iron Legion states that their security system is down. As Rescue leads the attack on Stark Unlimited, Jocasta downloads the same protection program used on her into the Sunset Bain A.I. in order for her to get the Iron Legion to stand down. In Washington DC sometime after Tony and Arno thwarted the Extinction Entity, Chairman Brickman is informed by the Sunset Bain A.I. that all the events were caused by her to make Baintronics a world power as she turns herself over to the authorities. At the Uncanny Valley Robot Bar, Machine Man and Jocasta were shown to have controlled the Sunset Bain A.I. into taking the blame.

Other versions

Earth-8410
An older Sunset was Machine Man's adversary in his cyberpunk mini-series set in the year 2020. She was still the head of Baintronics, which had leveraged the tech from Machine Man and Jocasta in order to become the predominant megacorporation of its day. Through a robot's mistake, Machine Man was freed and fought back against Baintronics. Machine Man was able to defeat Iron Man 2020 along with Sunset's other guards. Despite being 40 years past her prime, Sunset still was lively enough to attack Machine Man herself with a live power cable. Machine Man overcame even this and extracted a promise from Bain to leave him and his friends alone.

References

External links
 Marvel.com's article on Sunset Bain
 

Characters created by Steve Ditko
Characters created by Tom DeFalco
Comics characters introduced in 1980
Fictional artificial intelligences
Fictional business executives
Fictional characters from California
Fictional inventors
Marvel Comics female supervillains